The Green Mountain Arena is a 1,000-seat multi-purpose arena in Morrisville, Vermont.  It is home to the Peoples Academy High School Wolves varsity hockey team.  In the fall of 2011, it was home to the short lived Vermont Wild of the Federal Hockey League.

External links
Green Mountain Arena official website

Indoor arenas in Vermont
Sports venues in Vermont
Indoor ice hockey venues in the United States